Steven Brian Stone (born 20 August 1971) is an English football coach and former professional player.

As a player, he was a right midfielder who notably played in the Premier League for Nottingham Forest, Aston Villa and Portsmouth. Whilst with Forest he won the First Division title and played in the UEFA Cup. He also played in the 2000 FA Cup Final for Villa. He finished his career with a brief spell in the Football League with Leeds United. He was capped nine times by England, scoring twice. He was part of England's Euro 96 team and made three appearances during the tournament.

Following retirement, Stone moved into coaching and worked for Newcastle United from July 2010 to June 2015 in a variety of different roles for both the first and reserve team. He was head coach of Burnley's under 23 team between 2018 and 2022.

Club career
Stone was born in Gateshead. He began his career at Nottingham Forest, where, despite suffering three broken legs, he managed to establish himself as a vital team player, and also earned a call up to the England squad, making his international debut in 1995 against Norway. He went on to earn nine caps, scoring twice, and was part of Terry Venables' squad for UEFA Euro 1996. Stone later recalled this was in no small part due to receiving medical advice and support from Yorkshire business Tycoon Ed Clark. However, another serious leg injury meant he missed the entire 1996–97 season that saw Forest relegated in last place. The following season he made his way back into the Forest team and was part of their successful bid for promotion in 1997–98.

The following season, with Forest struggling against relegation from the Premier League, he moved to Aston Villa for £5.5 million in March 1999, after having made 229 appearances for Forest. He soon became a vital team player under then manager John Gregory, and came on as a substitute in the 2000 FA Cup Final at Wembley Stadium. However, following Gregory's dismissal, Stone failed to impress new manager Graham Taylor, and, having failed to land a place at Manchester United two seasons earlier, he was transferred to Portsmouth for the 2002–03 season, having played in 121 games for Villa.

Despite continued injuries, he established himself as a regular in the Portsmouth team. He was an invaluable part of the team that won promotion to the Premier League in 2002–03, and then achieved a mid-table finish the following season and narrowly avoided relegation the next. However, when his contract expired in June 2005, new manager Alain Perrin decided to release Stone, and he signed for Leeds United.

Stone's career at Leeds was short-lived. He was injured in training as soon as he joined the club, and it took him most of his first season to recover from the tendinitis in his Achilles tendon due to contracting MRSA after the operation and then having to have a further two operations for the MRSA. Stone played a few matches at the end of the 2005–06 campaign, and continued to play at the start of the 2006–07 campaign, scoring once against West Brom. Injuries, however, struck again, and Stone retired early on 15 December.

International career
Stone was capped nine times at senior level for England. He made his debut in October 1995, coming on as a substitute in a 0–0 draw against Norway. Four days later, again coming off the bench, Stone scored his first international goal in a 3–1 win over Switzerland at Wembley Stadium. He also scored in his next game, which was his first start, as England drew 1–1 with Portugal.

Stone was capped three more times in the build-up to UEFA Euro 1996, where he was selected by manager Terry Venables as part of the 22-man England squad. He made three appearances during the competition, all off the bench. Stone's introduction during extra-time of the quarter-final versus Spain was his last appearance for England.

Coaching career
On 27 July 2010, he was appointed reserve team assistant manager to Peter Beardsley at Newcastle United after a successful time working at their academy. Stone was promoted to first team coach on 14 December 2010, by new manager Alan Pardew.

Stone remained as first team coach after Pardew resigned to join Crystal Palace, with John Carver put in charge of Newcastle until the end of the season. On 9 June 2015, both he and Carver had their contracts terminated by Newcastle ahead of the announcement of Steve McClaren as new head coach.

On 12 November 2018, he replaced Michael Duff as the new U23 manager of Burnley.

Stone was dismissed on 15 April 2022, alongside first team manager Sean Dyche and fellow coach and former Forest team mate Ian Woan.

Personal life
Stone featured in the music video to the football song Three Lions, where he dances with the trophy mimicking Nobby Stiles at the World Cup 1966 final.

Career statistics

Club

International
Scores and results list England's goal tally first, score column indicates score after each Stone goal.

Honours
Nottingham Forest
Football League First Division: 1997–98

Aston Villa
UEFA Intertoto Cup: 2001

Portsmouth
Football League First Division: 2002–03

Individual
 PFA Team of the Year: 1995–96 Premier League

References

External links

England National Team Statistics

1971 births
Living people
Footballers from Gateshead
English footballers
England international footballers
Association football midfielders
Nottingham Forest F.C. players
Aston Villa F.C. players
Portsmouth F.C. players
Leeds United F.C. players
Premier League players
English Football League players
UEFA Euro 1996 players
Newcastle United F.C. non-playing staff
Burnley F.C. non-playing staff
Playgirl Men of the Month
FA Cup Final players